John Bryan (17 October 1841 – 24 June 1909) was an English cricketer.  Bryan was a right-handed batsman.  He was born at Lower Slaughter, Gloucestershire.

Bryan made two first-class appearances for Gloucestershire against Surrey and Sussex in 1873, scoring 34 runs at a batting average of 17.00, with a high score of 24.

He died at Minchinhampton, Gloucestershire on 24 June 1909.

References

External links

1841 births
1909 deaths
English cricketers
Gloucestershire cricketers
People from Cotswold District